Oligosoma kokowai, the northern spotted skink, is a species of skink found in New Zealand.

References

Oligosoma
Reptiles described in 2017
Reptiles of New Zealand
Endemic fauna of New Zealand
Taxa named by Sabine Melzer
Taxa named by Trent Bell
Taxa named by Geoff B. Patterson
Endemic reptiles of New Zealand